The Grahapati Kokkala inscription is an epigraphic record documenting the dedication of a Shiva temple. It dates to 1000-1001 CE. It is one of several Chandella era inscriptions that mention a Grahapati family.

It is the earliest known reference to a Grahapati family. Unlike all other Chandella era Grahapati inscriptions which are Jain, this refers to a Shiva temple, although Verse 3 suggests that the builder also worshipped Jinas.

Location
It was found somewhere in Khajuraho or its vivicinity, and is currently located in the Vishvanath temple there.

Publication
The inscription was first published by  Cunningham, and has since been published in several books.

Description and contents
The inscription at Khajuraho, dated Samvat 1056, Kartika (1000–1001 AD), is engraved on a slab and records the dedication of a temple termed Vidyanatha temple. The current location of the Vidyanatha temple is uncertain; the inscription slab has been fixed to the Vishvanath temple. Cunningham had identified the Beejamandal temple at Jatkara village near Khajuraho as the Vishvanath temple.

Metrics
The most of the inscription is metrical, with the exception of the initial invocation to Shiva and the samvat at the end.

Text
It is a large 22 line text. It starts with invocation Om Namah Shivaya. 
 Verses 1-2: Invocation of Lord Shiva.
 Verse 3: Equates Shiva with Parama Brahma, Buddha, Vaman, Jina etc.
 Verses 5-7: Praise of the Padmavati city.
 Verses 8-14: Praises a family lineage of Grahapai Vamsha leading to Kokkala.
 Verses 15-21: Describe a town and the Vaidyanath temple built by  Kokkala.

Translation
Translations are provided by Kanhiayalal Agrawal  and Kale

See also
Indian inscriptions
 Khajuraho
 Padmavati Pawaya
 Beejamandal

Notes

External links
 A photograph of this inscription outside Vishvanth temple in Khajuraho.

Sanskrit inscriptions in India
Gupta and post-Gupta inscriptions